Vescovana is a comune (municipality) in the Province of Padua in the Italian region Veneto, located about  southwest of Venice and about  southwest of Padua.

Vescovana borders the following municipalities: Barbona, Boara Pisani, Granze, Rovigo, Sant'Urbano, Stanghella, Villa Estense.

Demographic evolution

References

External links
 www.comune.vescovana.pd.it/

Cities and towns in Veneto